Mangiarotti is a surname of Italian origin. Notable people with this surname include: 

 Angelo Mangiarotti (born 1921), Italian architect and industrial designer
 Carola Mangiarotti (born 1952), Italian fencer, daughter of Edoardo
 Dario Mangiarotti (1915–2010), Italian fencer, son of Giuseppe
 Edoardo Mangiarotti (1919–2012), Italian fencer, son of Giuseppe
 Giuseppe Mangiarotti (1883–?), Italian fencer
 Mario Mangiarotti (1920–2019), Italian fencer and sports manager